Claire Lynch (born February 20, 1954) is an American bluegrass musician, singer, songwriter, and producer. She is a three-time winner of the International Bluegrass Music Association's Female Vocalist of the Year honors. She is considered one of the two best female voices in bluegrass, a recognition she shares with Dale Ann Bradley.

Early life
Lynch moved to Huntsville, Alabama from Kingston, New York, when she was 12 years old. She grew up in a musical family, with her mother playing the piano and her father singing. She had two sisters with whom she would sing, including doing trios at church. In high school, she spent time writing and recording songs.

Career
Lynch's musical career transitioned during college when she became interested in bluegrass music. She joined a band called Hickory Wind, which eventually changed its name to the Front Porch String Band. Lynch played with the group until 1981, when it retired from the road. She then pursued a dual career of music and raising a family. The Front Porch String Band reunited in 1991, releasing the album Lines and Traces.

Discography

Awards and honors

Lynch has won numerous awards in her career, including being named the best female vocalist in 1997, 2010, and 2013 by the International Bluegrass Music Association. She also received a USA Walker Fellowship Award in 2012.

Three of Lynch's albums have been nominated for a Grammy in the Best Bluegrass Album category:

Moonlighter (1995) was nominated at the 38th Annual Grammy Awards
Silver and Gold (1997) was nominated at the 40th Annual Grammy Awards
North By South (2016) was nominated at the 59th Annual Grammy Awards

References

External links
 
 

1954 births
Living people
American bluegrass musicians
American women singers
Record producers from New York (state)
Songwriters from New York (state)
Compass Records artists
Guitarists from New York (state)
Musicians from Kingston, New York
Rounder Records artists
Singers from New York (state)
20th-century American guitarists
Country musicians from New York (state)
American women record producers
20th-century American women guitarists
21st-century American women